Jane Dawn Elizabeth Andrews (born 1 April 1967) is an English former royal dresser for Sarah, Duchess of York, who was convicted at the Old Bailey in 2001 of murdering her lover, Tom Cressman. She was released from prison in 2015.

Early life
Andrews was born in Cleethorpes, Lincolnshire. Her father worked as a joiner and her mother as a social worker. As a child, Andrews was promising and intelligent, excelling in grammar school. But because of the family's debt, they moved to a small townhouse in the nearby seaport town of Grimsby, where she attended Hereford Secondary School.

Throughout her teenage years, Andrews struggled with various psychological problems including depression, panic attacks, and an eating disorder. At the age of 15, she attempted suicide by overdose after her mother discovered her truancy. Two years later, at age 17, she became pregnant and had an abortion, which she later stated was a traumatising experience.

Andrews enrolled in a fashion course at the Grimsby College of Art, and afterward took a job designing children's clothes at Marks & Spencer. At age 21, she answered an anonymous advertisement in The Lady magazine for a personal dresser. Six months later, she was interviewed by Sarah, Duchess of York; four days after that, Andrews began working for the Duchess at Buckingham Palace. With a salary of £18,000 (equivalent to £42,000 in 2020), she lived a relatively opulent lifestyle and was able to purchase a new flat in Battersea Park. The occupation brought Andrews a higher status and a new circle of friends; she was reportedly involved with several men whom she met through her work.

Marriage and other relationships
In August 1990, after a short courtship, Andrews married Christopher Dunn-Butler, an IBM executive twenty years her senior. The couple were divorced five years later; Andrews claimed that "pressures of work" led to the couple's split, although Dunn-Butler said that she was repeatedly unfaithful. Andrews did admit to infidelity, saying, "I had a couple of flings. I'm not proud of it."

Following her divorce, Andrews met Dimitri Horne, the son of a Greek shipping magnate. When the two broke up acrimoniously, Andrews trashed the flat they shared and fell into a deep depression. She attempted suicide again by overdosing on drugs but survived without seeking medical treatment.

During this time, it is alleged that the Duchess was having an affair with Tuscan aristocrat Count Gaddo della Gherardesca; he supposedly also had feelings for Andrews. Shortly after this alleged fling, Andrews was dismissed from her job as the Duchess's royal dresser. Some believe that this issue led directly to Andrews's termination, but officials at Buckingham Palace state there is no truth in this and that her dismissal was a result of cost-cutting.

New marriage prospect
In 1998, a mutual acquaintance introduced Andrews to Thomas Ashley Cressman (22 October 1960 – 18 September 2000), a former stockbroker. Cressman ran a successful business selling car accessories and mixed in the upper echelons of London society. Because of her supposed financial hardships at the time, Andrews moved into Cressman's flat in Fulham shortly into their relationship. She gained employment at Claridge's Hotel in October 1999 as a PR manager but was required to leave after only two months. For the next two years in the couple's relationship, Andrews made it obvious that she had pinned all her hopes on Cressman as her future husband and father of her children.

Murder
In September 2000, Andrews accompanied Cressman on a holiday to Italy and also to his family's villa on the French Riviera. She was reportedly expecting Cressman to propose marriage to her during their holiday, but instead, he told her that he had no intention of marrying her. After returning to the couple's Fulham flat on 17 September, they began to argue heatedly. Cressman called police to say that "somebody is going to get hurt", but no police came to his flat. Later that night, while Cressman was sleeping, Andrews hit him with a cricket bat and then stabbed him with a knife.

Following the bloody attack, Andrews fled the scene. She contacted her ex-husband Christopher Dunn-Butler shortly after killing Cressman, then sent out text messages to friends inquiring about her lover's whereabouts and well-being. She claimed to have no involvement in Cressman's death and stated that he was being blackmailed. Andrews was untraceable for days until police in Cornwall found her overdosed in her car. She survived the suicide attempt and, after a police interrogation, Andrews was arrested and charged with Cressman's murder.

Trial and imprisonment
On 23 April 2001, Andrews went to trial at the Old Bailey. Prosecutors stated that the motive for the killing was a woman scorned. Andrews, however, testified in her own defence that Cressman had been abusive during their relationship, citing his alleged sexual obsessions and an incident two years earlier in which she had broken her arm while dancing, stating that Cressman had pushed her. She also claimed that she had suffered abuse during childhood which led her to kill. After twelve hours of jury deliberation, she was convicted of murder and sentenced to life in prison.

In 2001, the psychiatrist Trevor Turner diagnosed Andrews with borderline personality disorder and subsequently claimed in an ITV documentary that she was subject to coercive control by the deceased. Andrews initially served her sentence at HM Prison Bullwood Hall in Hockley, Essex and in November 2009, after having served nine years in custody, she escaped from the East Sutton Park Prison in Kent. After three days, she was captured in a hotel room with her family just six miles from the prison. She was ultimately not charged with absconding.

Release
Andrews had been considered for early release several times but was repeatedly adjudged to be a danger to the public. On 21 May 2015, it was nevertheless announced that Andrews would be released, and on 19 June she was released on licence, with a view to making the transition from prison to mainstream society in a probation hostel.

In 2018, her licence was revoked and she was recalled to prison, having been accused of harassing a former paramour. A police investigation found no evidence of the alleged harassment. Andrews was re-released from prison on 8 August 2019 initially on the condition she resided in a designated probation hostel.

References

1967 births
Living people
20th-century English criminals
Alumni of Grimsby Institute of Further & Higher Education
British female murderers
Criminals from Lincolnshire
Date of birth missing (living people)
English female criminals
English people convicted of murder
English prisoners sentenced to life imprisonment
Escapees from England and Wales detention
2000 murders in the United Kingdom
Murder in London
People convicted of murder by England and Wales
People with borderline personality disorder
Prisoners sentenced to life imprisonment by England and Wales
People educated at Ormiston Maritime Academy
2000 in London